María de la Cruz Patricia Franco Cruz (born 3 May 1960) is a Mexican politician from the Institutional Revolutionary Party. In 2012 she served as Deputy of the LXI Legislature of the Mexican Congress representing the State of Mexico.

References

1960 births
Living people
Politicians from the State of Mexico
Women members of the Chamber of Deputies (Mexico)
Institutional Revolutionary Party politicians
21st-century Mexican politicians
21st-century Mexican women politicians
Deputies of the LXI Legislature of Mexico
Members of the Chamber of Deputies (Mexico) for the State of Mexico